Serratia entomophila is a species of bacteria that like its cogenerate species uses itaconate. It was first isolated from the grass grub Costelytra zealandica infected with amber disease, suggesting some involvement in the latter. Its type strain is A1T (ATCC 43705T).

References

Further reading
Nuñez-Valdez, M. Eugenia, et al. "Identification of a putative Mexican strain of Serratia entomophila pathogenic against root-damaging larvae of Scarabaeidae (Coleoptera)." Applied and Environmental Microbiology 74.3 (2008): 802–810.
Hurst, Mark RH, Travis R. Glare, and Trevor A. Jackson. "Cloning Serratia entomophila antifeeding genes—a putative defective prophage active against the grass grub Costelytra zealandica." Journal of Bacteriology 186.15 (2004): 5116–5128.
Hurst, Mark RH, et al. "Plasmid-located pathogenicity determinants of Serratia entomophila, the causal agent of amber disease of grass grub, show similarity to the insecticidal toxins of Photorhabdus luminescens." Journal of Bacteriology 182.18 (2000): 5127–5138.

External links
LPSN
Type strain of Serratia entomophila at BacDive -  the Bacterial Diversity Metadatabase

Bacteria described in 1988
Enterobacterales